Johann Ambrosius Bach (22 February 1645 – ) was a German musician, father to Johann Sebastian Bach.

Life 
Johann Ambrosius Bach was born in Erfurt, Germany, the son of musician Christoph Bach (1613–1661). He was the twin brother of Johann Christoph Bach (1645–1693). Ambrosius was employed as a violinist in Erfurt.

In 1671, he moved his family to Eisenach, in present-day Thuringia, where he was employed as a court trumpeter and director of the town musicians. He married his first wife Maria Elisabeth Lämmerhirt on 1 April 1668, and had eight children by her, four of whom became musicians, including Johann Sebastian Bach, the famous German Baroque composer and musician. She was buried on 3 May 1694. On 27 November 1694 he married Barbara Margaretha, née Keul (she had already been twice widowed). He died in Eisenach less than three months later. After Johann Ambrosius Bach's death, his two children,  Johann Jacob Bach and Johann Sebastian Bach, moved in with his eldest son, Johann Christoph Bach.

See also
 Bach family

References

External links
Johann Ambrosius Bach on the Sojurn Web site
Johann Ambrosius Bach on the Bach Cantatas Web site

1645 births
1695 deaths
Johann Ambrosius
Musicians from Erfurt
Johann Sebastian Bach
German trumpeters
Male trumpeters
German violinists
German male violinists
17th-century classical composers
Twin musicians
German twins